BBC Wogan House is a building in central London owned by Abrdn and currently on long-term lease to the BBC. It is located on the junction of Gildea Street and Great Portland Street adjacent to the BBC's headquarters, Broadcasting House. Originally named Western House, on 16 November 2016 the building was renamed Wogan House after the Irish broadcaster Sir Terry Wogan, who had died in January that year, and broadcast his final Wake up to Wogan breakfast show from the building in December 2009.

History
The building has been used by the BBC since at least 1953, and for a long period the upper floors were occupied by the BBC's Engineering Designs Department, with the ground floor being occupied firstly by a car showroom and latterly being used for the BBC's Recorded Sound Effects Library. During this period, the building became the UK base for the first transatlantic colour television satellite communications. The BBC Engineering Designs Department was restructured in the late 1980s and subsequently vacated Western House in 1987.

Following extensive renovation in the early/mid-2000s, its main use since 2006 has been as the base of BBC Radio 2 and BBC Radio 6 Music, although it also houses several smaller radio studios for use by other BBC stations as well as a gym, bar and bistro for use by members of the BBC Club and guests. 

On 2 November 2022, it was announced that the BBC would be moving out of the building, relocating Radio 2 and 6 Music back to BBC Broadcasting House, by spring 2024.

References

Buildings and structures in the City of Westminster
BBC offices, studios and buildings
BBC Radio 2 
BBC Radio 6 Music
Cultural and educational buildings in London